The Boyongan mine is a large copper mine located in the south of the Philippines in Surigao del Norte. Boyongan represents one of the largest copper reserves in the world, having estimated reserves of 300 million tonnes of ore grading 0.6% copper. The mine also has reserves of 9.6 million oz of gold.

References 

Copper mines in the Philippines
Geography of Surigao del Norte